The 2017 Campeonato Goiano  (officially the Campeonato Goiano de Profissionais da 1ª Divisão – Edição 2017) is the 74th edition of Goiás's top professional football league. The competition began on 28 January 2017 and end on 7 de May 2017.

Participating teams

Format
In the first stage, the 10 teams were drawn into two groups of five teams each.

Final stage

Championship selection 

01. Marcelo Rangel (Goiás);
02. Magno Silva (Vila Nova);
03. Wesley Matos (Vila Nova);
04. Mirita (Aparecidense);
06. Patrick (Goiás);
05. Léo Sena (Goiás);
08. Clécio (Aparecidense);
10. Tiago Luís (Goiás);
11. Gilmar (Itumbiara);
07. Moisés (Vila Nova);
09. Léo Gamalho (Goiás).

Técnico: Zé Teodoro (Aparecidense)
Artilheiro: Gilmar (Itumbiara)
Revelação: Michael (Goianésia)
Craque: Tiago Luís (Goiás)
Melhor árbitro: Eduardo Tomaz
Assistentes: Bruno Pires e Fabrício Vilarinho

References

Campeonato Goiano seasons